Sunday Chukwuemeka Emmanuel (born 25 February 1992) is a Nigerian professional footballer who plays as a striker for Dhaka Mohammedan in the Bangladesh Premier League.

Career
Emmanuel started his career in Nigeria before playing for a host of Vietnamese clubs. In 2014, he was transferred to SV Grödig of Austria.

He made his international debut against Angola.

References

1992 births
Living people
Expatriate footballers in Portugal
Association football forwards
Nigerian footballers
Gombe United F.C. players
Sunshine Stars F.C. players
SV Grödig players
Austrian Football Bundesliga players
Nigeria international footballers
Than Quang Ninh FC players
Becamex Binh Duong FC players
V.League 1 players
Can Tho FC players
Lincoln Red Imps F.C. players
Nigerian expatriate sportspeople in Vietnam
Expatriate footballers in Vietnam
Nigerian expatriate sportspeople in Austria
Expatriate footballers in Austria
Nigerian expatriate footballers
Gibraltar National League players